Salem Al-Ajalin (born on 18 February 1988) is a Jordanian footballer who plays for Al-Faisaly and the Jordan national football team.

International career

International goals
Scores and results list Jordan's goal tally first.

References

External links 
 
 

Association football defenders
Jordanian footballers
Jordan international footballers
Living people
1988 births
Jordanian Pro League players
Al-Faisaly SC players
Al-Ahli SC (Amman) players
Al-Jazeera (Jordan) players
Mansheyat Bani Hasan players
2019 AFC Asian Cup players